Charles-Maxime Catherinet de Villemarest was a 19th-century French writer. He authored a three-volume biography of Prince Talleyrand, published in 1835. He was credited with editing the memoirs of Bourrienne, but perhaps also largely wrote them.<ref>{{cite book|first=William H. C. |last=Smith|title=The Bonapartes: The History of a Dynasty (Continuum International, 2007)|page=5|url=https://books.google.com/books?id=Eu5PvM9_fuAC&pg=PA5|isbn=9781852855789|date=2007-01-20}}</ref> He also ghost-wrote the memoirs of the femme de chambre'' of Empress Josephine, one Mme. D'Avrillon.

References

French biographers
Ghostwriters
French male writers
19th-century French male writers
Year of birth missing
Year of death missing